This is list of elections in Canada in 1995. Included are provincial, municipal and  federal elections, by-elections on any level, referendums and party leadership races at any level.

January

February

March

April

May
8: New Brunswick municipal elections

June

July

August

September

October

November

December

See also
Municipal elections in Canada
Elections in Canada